Suriyani Malayalam (സുറിയാനി മലയാളം, ܣܘܪܝܢܝ ܡܠܝܠܡ), also known as Karshoni, Syro-Malabarica or Syriac Malayalam, is a dialect of Malayalam written in a variant form of the Syriac alphabet which was popular among the Saint Thomas Christians (also known as Syrian Christians or Nasranis) of Kerala in India. It uses Malayalam grammar, the Maḏnḥāyā or "Eastern" Syriac script with special orthographic features, and vocabulary from Malayalam and East Syriac. This originated in the South Indian region of the Malabar Coast (modern-day Kerala). Until the 19th century, the script was widely used by Syrian Christians in Kerala.

Writing system
There were numerous problems in writing Malayalam using the Syriac alphabet, which was designed for a Semitic language. Only 22 letters were available from East Syriac orthography to render over 53 phonemes of Malayalam. Both the languages are not related to one another in any way except for religious causes. These problems were overcome by creating additional letters.
Basic Syriac ʾĀlap̄ Bēṯ based on form with corresponding Malayalam letters

Additional Malayalam letters

* Malayalam alveolar nasal encoded as U+0D29 for scholarly purposes.

Vowels

Unicode
The Syriac alphabet was added to the Unicode Standard in September, 1999 with the release of version 3.0.
Additional letters for Suriyani Malayalam were added in June, 2017 with the release of version 10.0.

Blocks

The Unicode block for Syriac is U+0700–U+074F:

The Syriac Abbreviation (a type of overline) can be represented with a special control character called the Syriac Abbreviation Mark (U+070F).

The Unicode block for Suriyani Malayalam specific letters is called the Syriac Supplement block and is U+0860–U+086F:

Loanwords
Over the centuries, Malayalam borrowed Eastern Syriac words. A few of them are given below:

Literature
Vedatharkam written by Kariattil Mar Ousep is one of the famous books written in Suriyani Malayalam. Large number of documents written in Suriyani Malayalam are found among the Saint Thomas Christians or Nasranis of Kerala. These documents include an alternate set of the Canons of the Synod of Diamper. 
At present the dialect is not in popular usage. However it strives in historical literature of the Saint Thomas Christian denominations. Thomas Koonammakkal is one of the most notable experts in Garshuni Malayalam studies.

See also
 Judeo-Malayalam
 Arabi Malayalam
 Garshuni

References

Further reading
 
 
 
 

Malayalam language
Syriac alphabet